The Diary of a Country Priest is a 1936 novel by the French writer Georges Bernanos. The novel received the Grand Prix du roman de l'Académie française. In 1950 it was named one of the twelve best novels in the French language published between 1900 and 1950. It was the basis for the 1951 film Diary of a Country Priest, directed by Robert Bresson.

The book was published in English in 1937 in a translation by Pamela Morris.

Synopsis
The story is set in Ambricourt in northern France, where a young, newly appointed Catholic priest struggles with stomach pains and the lack of faith within his parish. He knows he is weak, inferior, and sometimes thinks himself touched by madness, but strongly believes that the grace of God passes through his priesthood: “All is grace!".

The diary is divided into three parts:

 In the first, the young priest describes his arrival in his parish in the north of France and his first experiences with the poor population.
 The second is about daily life in the parish. The priest describes his encounters with different people and the results of his work. He fails to fulfill his duty, and it is only during a crisis in the local palace that he succeeds in convincing the Countess of the existence of God. This conversation with the Countess is the culmination of the novel. She finds herself in a fatal situation and dies a day later.
 The last part deals with the stay and the death of the priest in Lille after a medical examination.

References

External links
 Diary of a Country Priest
  (French version)

1936 French novels
Catholic novels
French-language novels
French novels adapted into films
Novels by Georges Bernanos
Plon (publisher) books